Sixth Happiness is a 1997 British drama film directed by Indian director Waris Hussein. It is based on the 1991 autobiography of Firdaus Kanga entitled Trying to Grow. Kanga played himself in this film about Britain, India, race and sex.

Sixth Happiness also features performances from Souad Faress, Nina Wadia, Indira Varma, and Meera Syal.

Plot
Sixth Happiness is about Brit, a boy born with brittle bones who never grows taller than four feet, and his sexual awakening as family life crumbles around him. It is also about the Parsi or Parsees – descendants of the Persian empire who were driven out of Persia by an Islamic invasion more than a thousand years ago and settled in western India. Parsees had a close relationship with the British during the years of the Raj. Brit is named by his mother, both after his brittle bones, and in tribute to his mother's love of Britain.

Brit's family is non-stereotypical: his parents are ardent Anglophiles with fond memories of the Raj and World War II.  Brit is bright, spiky, opinionated and selfish with a razor-sharp wit, never a martyr or victim. He prefers the Kama Sutra to Shakespeare and does not allow gender or disability to come in the way of his desire for sex and love.

Cast
Firdaus Kanga as Brit Kotwal
Souad Faress as  Sera Kotwal
Khodus Wadia as Sam Kotwal
Nina Wadia as Dolly Kotwal
Ahsen Bhatti as Cyrus
Mahabanoo Mody-Kotwal as Jeroo
Nisha K. Nayar as Tina
Indira Varma as Amy
Pratima Kazmi as Brothel Madam

External links
 
 New York Times review

1997 films
1997 drama films
British drama films
British Indian films
Films based on British novels
Films directed by Waris Hussein
Films shot in London
Films shot in Maharashtra
1990s English-language films
1990s British films